Andreas Rinkel (10 January 1889 – 25 March 1979) was a Dutch priest who served as the nineteenth Archbishop of Utrecht from 1937 to 1970.

Early ministry

Before serving as Archbishop of Utrecht, Rinkel served as a parish priest in Amersfoort, Holland, and as a professor at the seminary there. He was part of the Old Catholic commission that worked toward the reconciliation of the Old Catholic Church with the Anglican Church.

Archbishop of Utrecht

Following the death of Franciscus Kenninck, Archbishop of Utrecht, on 10 February 1937, Rinkel was consecrated Archbishop of Utrecht at St. Gertrude Cathedral in Utrecht by Bishop Johannes Hermannus Berends of Deventer, assisted by the Old Catholic bishops of Harlem, Germany, Switzerland, and Czechoslovakia.

See also
Catholic Church in the Netherlands
List of Old Catholic churches

References

 

Dutch Old Catholic bishops
1979 deaths
20th-century archbishops
1889 births
Archbishops of Utrecht
People from Ouderkerk